D209 is a state road in Međimurje region of Croatia connecting Mursko Središće and nearby border crossing to Slovenia to D3 state road in Čakovec, and the road also serves as a connecting road to the A4 motorway as it terminates near Čakovec interchange (via the D3). The northern terminus of the road is located at Mursko Središće border crossing, providing access to Slovenian town of Lendava and Slovenian A5 motorway in Lendava interchange.

The road, as well as all other state roads in Croatia, is managed and maintained by Hrvatske ceste, state owned company.

Traffic volume 

Traffic is regularly counted and reported by Hrvatske ceste, operator of the road.

Road junctions and populated areas

Maps

Sources

State roads in Croatia
Međimurje County